The 2018 Keio Challenger was a professional tennis tournament played on hard courts. It was the thirteenth (ATP) and second (ITF) editions of the tournament and part of the 2018 ATP Challenger Tour and the 2018 ITF Women's Circuit. It took place in Yokohama, Japan between 26 February and 4 March 2018 for the men's edition and between 5 and 11 March 2018 for the women's.

Men's singles main-draw entrants

Seeds

 1 Rankings are as of 19 February 2018.

Other entrants
The following players received wildcards into the singles main draw:
  Shinji Hazawa
  Kaito Itsusaki
  Kaito Uesugi
  Yosuke Watanuki

The following player received entry into the singles main draw as a special exempt:
  Blake Ellis

The following players received entry from the qualifying draw:
  Chung Yun-seong
  Hiroyasu Ehara
  Hiroki Moriya
  Jumpei Yamasaki

The following player received entry as a lucky loser:
  Daniel Nguyen

Women's singles main-draw entrants

Seeds

 1 Rankings are as of 26 February 2018.

Other entrants
The following players received wildcards into the singles main draw:
  Ayumi Hirata
  Marina Kurosu
  Megumi Nishimoto
  Satoko Sueno

The following players received entry from the qualifying draw:
  Harriet Dart 
  Misa Eguchi
  Mai Hontama
  Momoko Kobori
  Lee Ya-hsuan
  Ma Yexin
  Katherine Sebov
  Moyuka Uchijima

Champions

Men's singles

 Yasutaka Uchiyama def.  Tatsuma Ito 2–6, 6–3, 6–4.

Women's singles
 Veronika Kudermetova def.  Harriet Dart, 6–2, 6–4

Men's doubles

 Tobias Kamke /  Tim Pütz  def.  Sanchai Ratiwatana /  Sonchat Ratiwatana 3–6, 7–5, [12–10].

Women's doubles
 Laura Robson /  Fanny Stollár def.  Momoko Kobori /  Chihiro Muramatsu, 5–7, 6–2, [10–4]

External links
Official Website

2018 ATP Challenger Tour
2018 in Japanese tennis
2018 ITF Women's Circuit
2018
February 2018 sports events in Japan
March 2018 sports events in Japan
2018 Keio Challenger